Freeborn County is a county in the state of Minnesota. As of the 2020 United States Census, the population was 30,895. Its county seat is Albert Lea. Freeborn County comprises the Albert Lea Micropolitan Statistical Area.

History
Freeborn County was created on February 20, 1855, the territory being separated from Blue Earth and Rice Counties. Twelve other Minnesota counties were created the same day by the Minnesota Territorial Legislature. Freeborn County was named for William Freeborn, an early Minnesota pioneer, merchant, and territorial legislator.

Geography
Freeborn County lies on Minnesota's border with Iowa. The Shell Rock River flows southward from Albert Lea Lake in central Freeborn County, crossing into Iowa. Turtle Creek flows eastward through the upper eastern part of the county, crossing into Mower County. The terrain is hilly and etched with drainages and gullies. The Le Sueur River, a tributary of the Minnesota River, begins in the northern part of the county and flows northward into Waseca County. The Cobb River and the Maple River, two other small rivers, begin in the extreme northwest corner of the county, the Cobb from Freeborn Lake and the Maple from Penny Lake. Both run generally northwest, emptying into the LeSueur River, just upstream from where the LeSueur empties into the Minnesota River, on the western edge of Mankato. Most of the available land is devoted to agriculture. The terrain generally slopes to the south and east, although the highest point is near the northeast corner, at 1,296' (395m) ASL.

Lakes

 Albert Lea Lake
 Bear Lake
 Church Lake
 Everhart Lake
 Fountain Lake
 Freeborn Lake
 Geneva Lake
 Goose Lake
 Halls Lake
 Hickory Lake
 Lower Twin Lake
 Penny Lake
 Pickerel Lake
 School Section Lake
 State Line Lake
 Sugar Lake
 Trenton Lake (part)
 Upper Twin Lake
 White Lake

Protected areas

 Bear Lake State Wildlife Management Area
 Carex State Wildlife Management Area
 Halls Lake State Wildlife Area
 Moscow State Game Refuge
 Myre-Big Island State Park
 White Woods County Park

Major highways

  Interstate 35
  Interstate 90
  U.S. Highway 65
  U.S. Highway 69
  Minnesota State Highway 13
  Minnesota State Highway 109
  Minnesota State Highway 251

Adjacent counties

 Steele County - northeast
 Mower County - east
 Worth County, Iowa - south
 Winnebago County, Iowa - southwest
 Faribault County - west
 Waseca County - northwest

Demographics

2000 census
As of the 2000 census, there were 32,584 people, 13,356 households, and 9,015 families in the county. The population density was 46.1/sqmi (17.8/km2). There were 13,996 housing units at an average density of 19.8/sqmi (7.64/km2). The racial makeup of the county was 95.22% White, 0.24% Black or African American, 0.20% Native American, 0.55% Asian, 0.02% Pacific Islander, 2.92% from other races, and 0.85% from two or more races. 6.29% of the population were Hispanic or Latino of any race. 34.8% were of Norwegian, 26.2% German and 5.8% Danish ancestry.

There were 13,356 households, of which 29.1% had children under age 18 living with them, 56.5% were married couples living together, 7.5% had a female householder with no husband present, and 32.5% were non-families. 28.2% of all households were made up of individuals, and 14.0% had someone living alone who was 65 or older. The average household size was 2.40 and the average family size was 2.92.

The county population contained 24.0% under 18, 7.5% from 18 to 24, 25.5% from 25 to 44, 24.1% from 45 to 64, and 18.9% who were 65 or older. The median age was 40. For every 100 females there were 96.6 males. For every 100 females 18 and older, there were 95.0 males.

The median income for a household in the county was $36,964, and the median income for a family was $45,142. Males had a median income of $31,491 versus $21,799 for females. The per capita income for the county was $18,325. About 5.6% of families and 8.4% of the population were below the poverty line, including 9.0% of those under 18 and 9.1% of those over 64.

2020 Census

Communities

Cities

 Albert Lea (county seat)
 Alden
 Clarks Grove
 Conger
 Emmons
 Freeborn
 Geneva
 Glenville
 Hartland
 Hayward
 Hollandale
 Manchester
 Myrtle
 Twin Lakes

Unincorporated communities

 Armstrong
 Corning (partial)
 Gordonsville
 Mansfield
 Maple Island
 Moscow
 Oakland
 Petran

Townships

 Albert Lea Township
 Alden Township
 Bancroft Township
 Bath Township
 Carlston Township
 Freeborn Township
 Freeman Township
 Geneva Township
 Hartland Township
 Hayward Township
 London Township
 Manchester Township
 Mansfield Township
 Moscow Township
 Newry Township
 Nunda Township
 Oakland Township
 Pickerel Lake Township
 Riceland Township
 Shell Rock Township

Government and politics

See also
 National Register of Historic Places listings in Freeborn County, Minnesota

References

External links
 Freeborn County website

 
Minnesota counties
1855 establishments in Minnesota Territory